Hamilton, Larkhall and Stonehouse is a constituency of the Scottish Parliament (Holyrood) covering part of the council area of South Lanarkshire. It elects one Member of the Scottish Parliament (MSP) by the plurality (first past the post) method of election. Also, however, it is one of nine constituencies in the Central Scotland electoral region, which elects seven additional members, in addition to nine constituency MSPs, to produce a form of proportional representation for the region as a whole.

The constituency was created for the 2011 Scottish Parliament election from parts of the former constituencies of Hamilton South and Hamilton North and Bellshill, along with some areas that were formerly in the Clydesdale constituencies. The seat has been held by Christina McKelvie of the Scottish National Party since creation.

Electoral region 

The other eight constituencies of the Central Scotland region are Airdrie and Shotts, Coatbridge and Chryston, Cumbernauld and Kilsyth, East Kilbride, Falkirk East, Falkirk West, Motherwell and Wishaw and Uddingston and Bellshill.

The region covers all of the Falkirk council area, all of the North Lanarkshire council area and part of the South Lanarkshire council area.

Constituency boundaries and council areas 

The rest of the South Lanarkshire area is covered by another four constituencies: East Kilbride and Uddingston and Bellshill which are within the Central Scotland region. Rutherglen within the Glasgow region, and Clydesdale within the South Scotland region.

The Hamilton, Larkhall and Stonehouse constituency consists of the following electoral wards:

In full: Hamilton West and Earnock, Hamilton South, Larkhall
In part: Avondale and Stonehouse (shared with Clydesdale), Hamilton North and East (shared with Uddingston and Bellshill)

Member of the Scottish Parliament

Election results

2020s

2010s

Notes

External links

Scottish Parliament constituencies and regions from 2011
Constituencies of the Scottish Parliament
2011 establishments in Scotland
Constituencies established in 2011
Hamilton, South Lanarkshire
Larkhall
Politics of South Lanarkshire
Stonehouse, South Lanarkshire